Mano Khalil is a Kurdish-Swiss film director living in Switzerland. He studied history and law at Damascus University and moved to Czechoslovakia in 1987 to study fiction and film direction. Between 1990 and 1995 he worked as an independent film director for Czechoslovak and later for Slovak Television. Since 1996, he has lived in Switzerland, working as an independent film director and producer.

Filmography 
2007     David der Tolhildan,  Documentary, 54 Min. co production with  Swiss TV SF, TSR, TSI. 
 Neighbours, 2021 (Director)

References

External links

Mano Khalil's Frame Film GmbH

Damascus University alumni
Syrian film directors
Living people
Syrian emigrants to Czechoslovakia
Year of birth missing (living people)
Place of birth missing (living people)
Kurdish film directors